Karkamani was a Meroitic king who ruled in the 6th century, probably between 519 to 510 BC at Napata. He succeeded King Amaninatakilebte and was in turn succeeded by King Amaniastabarqa. Like others of his dynasty, he was discovered buried among the pyramid chambers at Nuri, specifically Nuri 7.

References

6th-century BC monarchs of Kush